Baba Ali Chaouch, also written as Baba Ali Chaouche, or simply Ali I, was the first independent ruler of the Deylik of Algiers who ruled from 1710 to 1718.

Background 
Not much is known about the origins of Ali. Some sources describe him as a Basche-Chaouch, (which would explain the name) a title usually held by Kouloughlis which would mean that he was most likely of mixed Algerian-Turkish descent, albeit it's up to debate. But the most probable hypothesis is the Kabyle-Georgian (Mingrelian) origin of Baba Ali.

Rule 
He did major political reforms, succeeding dey Ibrahim in a period of great unrest. He reformed the divan of Algiers, dissolved it and then recomposed it, eliminated the rebellious elements of the Odjak of Algiers, relied on the taifa of the rais to revive Privateering in the Mediterranean and brought in lots of income to the city.

He was the first dey to incorporate the title of pasha into his, banishing the Pasha appointed by the Ottoman Empire. He refused to accept representatives of the Ottoman Sultan at his side even if they remained in local politics as a purely honorary function devoid of any real prerogative. He thus started a rapid political evolution in the emancipation of the regency of Algiers from the Ottoman tutelage and formalized its status as an independent political entity. Because of his position, he is popular with the people of Algiers and famous in historiography.

Baba Ali Chaouch consolidated his authority, as he was at the head of a structured state: the eastern and western borders were demarcated, the local governments at the central and provincial level (beyliks) were well organized, the functions of each being defined. The dey was then seen as a sovereign ally, no longer as a vassal of the Ottoman Empire by the European consuls. The Algerian state then took the form of a sort of "Elective monarchy" , administered according to the primacy of its own interests.

He declared war against the Dutch in 1715, and planned to do the same to Britain, albeit he stopped after tribute arrived from them.

An earthquake hit Algiers under his rule in 1716.

Death 
Despite many assassination attempts and conspiracies against him, he died a natural death in 1718.

See also 

 List of governors and rulers of the Regency of Algiers
 Barbary Coast

References

Sources
 

Much of this wikipedia page was translate from the French version.

Deys of Algiers
1718 deaths
Barbary pirates
18th-century Algerian people
17th-century Algerian people
18th-century monarchs in Africa
Arab slave owners